Immaculate Heart of Mary is a Roman Catholic devotional name used to refer to the Catholic view of the interior life of Mary, mother of Jesus

Immaculate Heart of Mary, Sacred Heart of Mary, or variations may refer to:

Churches

India
Church of Immaculate Heart of Mary, Sathankulam, a church in Tamil Nadu
Immaculate Heart Church, Karnal, a church under Roman Catholic Diocese of Simla and Chandigarh

Russia
Immaculate Heart of Mary Church, Kemerovo, Kuzbass, Russia

United Kingdom
Church of the Immaculate Heart of Mary, a Roman Catholic church in Knightsbridge, London

United States
Immaculate Heart of Mary (Phoenix, Arizona), listed on the NRHP in Maricopa County, Arizona
Immaculate Heart of Mary Church (North Little Rock, Arkansas), listed on the NRHP in Pulaski County, Arkansas
Immaculate Heart of Mary (Los Angeles, California)
Immaculate Heart of Mary Catholic Church in Papaikou, a Roman Catholic church in Papaikou, Hawaii
Immaculate Heart of Mary Catholic Church (Windthorst, Kansas), listed on the NRHP in Ford County, Kansas
Immaculate Heart of Mary (Pittsburgh), a Roman Catholic church 
Immaculate Heart of Mary Church (Cleveland, Ohio), a Roman Catholic church

See also
Immaculate Heart of Mary Cathedral (disambiguation)
Immaculate Heart of Mary School (disambiguation)